Coleophora rectilineella is a moth of the family Coleophoridae. It is found from France and Italy to Romania.

The larvae feed on Alchemilla alpina, Anemone, Anthyllis vulneraria alpestris, Aster amellus, Centaurea jaceak, Cerastium, Globularia cordifolia, Leucanthemopsis alpine, Leucanthemum, Primula elatior, Primula farinosa, Ranunculus acris and Salix reticulata. The youth case is cigar-shaped and hairy. The adult case is a bivalved, black, silken sheath case. The case is thickest around the middle, clearly tapering towards the rear end. The length is 13–15 mm and the mouth angle is about 50°. Larvae can be found from August to May.

References

rectilineella
Moths of Europe
Taxa named by Josef Emanuel Fischer von Röslerstamm
Moths described in 1843